Sigurður Nordal (14 September 1886 – 21 September 1974) was an Icelandic scholar, writer, and ambassador. He was influential in forming the theory of the Icelandic sagas as works of literature composed by individual authors.

Education 
Nordal studied Scandinavian Philology in Copenhagen where he received his MA in 1912. In 1914 he completed his doctoral thesis. He then went on to study philosophy in Berlin and Oxford.

Career 
In 1918 he became Professor of Icelandic Language and Literature at the University of Iceland. He retained this position until his death but was exempted from teaching duties in 1945. From 1931 to 1932 Nordal held the Charles Eliot Norton professorship at Harvard University. From 1951 to 1957 he was the Icelandic ambassador in Copenhagen. He was the editor-in-chief of the Íslenzk fornrit series from 1933 to 1951. In 1965, he coined the word "tölva" (a portmanteau made from tölu-völva / "numerical oracle") as the Icelandic word for "computer." His neologism would become the standard word.

Some of Sigurður Nordal's most influential works are:
Völuspá: A treatise on the Eddic poem Völuspá, regarding the poem as a coherent work by one poet.
Íslenzk menning ("Icelandic Culture"): Often considered Nordal's greatest work, this book was used as a standard text in Icelandic colleges.
Hrafnkatla: A treatise on Hrafnkels saga, aiming to establish that the saga was a fictional work of art.
Samhengið í íslenzkum bókmenntum ("The Continuity of Icelandic Literature").
Fyrirlestrar um íslenzka bókmenntasögu 1350-1750 ("Lectures on the History of Icelandic Literature 1350-1750"): 

"In the 1920s, there was a rumour that Kvaran was considered for the Nobel Prize in Literature, but in response Sigurður Nordal disparaged him as overly focused on forgiveness and thus tolerant of things that should rather be opposed; in the spirit of Icelandic nationalism and contemporary interpretations of Nietzsche, he considered the blood feud a better ethical mode."

Sigurður Nordal also published two very influential anthologies: Íslenzk lestrarbók 1750-1930 (1st ed. 1924) and Sýnisbók íslenzkra bókmennta til miðrar átjándu aldar (1953), the latter one in collaboration with Guðrún P. Helgadóttir and Jón Jóhannesson. They deserve mention since they were required reading in Icelandic gymnasia for the better part of a century.

Notes

References

 
 

 

1886 births
1974 deaths
Harvard University faculty
Sigurdur Nordal 
Sigurdur Nordal
Ambassadors of Iceland to Denmark
Anthologists
Corresponding Fellows of the Medieval Academy of America